Autostrade Lombarde is an Italian holding company that owned a majority stake (78.9752%) in Società di Progetto Brebemi S.p.A., the operator of Autostrada A35 (Brescia–Bergamo–Milan, although the toll road did not go through Bergamo city but the province). The company also owned 27.958% stake in Autostrade Bergamasche (ex-Interconnessione Pedemontana-Brebemi), a company that own the concession to connect Autostrada A35 and Autostrada A36.

Intesa Sanpaolo purchased 39.3% equity stake of Autostrade Lombarde from Autostrade per l'Italia, a subsidiary of Atlantia in 2007.

Shareholders

 Intesa Sanpaolo (42.4461%)
 Società Autostrada Torino–Alessandria–Piacenza (13.3354%)
 Impresa Pizzarotti (6.4140%)
 Unieco (5.7726%)
 Autostrade Centro Padane (5.4068%)
 Mattioda Pierino e Figli (5.3450%)
 Autostrada Brescia–Verona–Vicenza–Padova (A4 Holding) (4.9015%)
 Milan Chamber of Commerce
 direct (0.0000%)
 Parcam (2.8177%)
 Milano Serravalle – Milano Tangenziali (2.7794%)
 Brescia Chamber of Commerce (2.7575%)
 Tecnoinfrastrutture (Tecno Holding) (2.1380%)
 Province of Bergamo (1.1396%)
 Province of Brescia (0.8866%)
 Bergamo Chamber of Commerce (0.7143%)
 Cooperativa Muratori e Braccianti di Carpi (0.6414%)
 Metropolitan City of Milan (0.6087%)
 UBI Banca (0.6053%)
 direct (0.5301%)
 Banco di Brescia (0.0752%)
 Cassa Rurale Treviglio (0.4122%)
 Associazione Industriale Bresciana (0.3669%)
 Brescia Comune (0.2031%)
 Cremona Chamber of Commerce (0.1100%)
 Treviglio Comune (0.0877%)
 Banco Popolare (0.0787%)
 Confindustria Bergamo (0.0135%)
 Assolombarda (0.0089%)
 Caravaggio Comune (0.0061%)
 Travagliato Comune (0.0061%)

References

External links
 

Private road operators of Italy
Companies based in Brescia
Region-owned companies of Italy
Transport in Lombardy
Intesa Sanpaolo